Zdeněk Nytra (born 6 October 1961) is a Czech politician who has been Senator from Ostrava since 2016.

Biography
He studied at Technical University of Ostrava. He became a professional fireman in 1984. He started as a commander of Fireman's corp for protection of trains in Ostrava. He joined Firemen's security corps of Ostrava in 1991. In 2001 he became Chairman of Firemen's security corps of Moravian-Silesian Region.

Political career
He ran for Proskovice municipal assembly in 2002 election as a candidate of the Civic Democratic Party. He wasn't elected but in 2006 he became a member of Moravská Ostrava a Přívoz assembly. He was reelected in 2010 and 2014 election.

He decided to run for Senate in 2016 election. He officially ran as an independent but was supported by Civic Democratic Party, TOP 09 and Freeholder Party of the Czech Republic. He advanced to the second round and narrowly defeated Liana Janáčková.

During  2018 presidential election, Nytra endorsed Mirek Topolánek.

Nytra leads the Civic Democratic Party during 2018 municipal election.

References

1961 births
Living people
Civic Democratic Party (Czech Republic) Senators
People from Frýdek-Místek
Technical University of Ostrava alumni